Elliott Hong is a Korean American film director, producer and writer.

Hong is best known as the director of the films They Call Me Bruce?, The Retrievers, Kill the Golden Goose and the 1973 documentary Tears of Buddha.

Filmography
The Rose of Sharon (2006)
They Call Me Bruce? (1982)
The Retrievers (1982)
Kill the Golden Goose (1979)
Tears of Buddha (1973)

References

External links

American film directors
American film producers
South Korean emigrants to the United Kingdom
American male screenwriters
Living people
Year of birth missing (living people)